Baumhauer is a German surname meaning "lumberjack". Notable people with the surname include:

Charles A. Baumhauer, American community leader and politician
Joseph Baumhauer (died 1772), prominent German ébéniste that worked in France
Heinrich Adolph Baumhauer (died 1926), German chemist and mineralogist

See also 
9699 Baumhauer, main-belt asteroid

German-language surnames
Occupational surnames